Babyshop is a children's retail store and the first company under Landmark Group. The company serves 19 countries with over 235 stores, and has over 4.8 million customers. The store focuses on children's products for ages 0 to 16 and sells major brands including Barbie, Disney, Philips AVENT, Fisher-Price, Chicco, Juniors, Giggles, Graco, Lego, Joie, Hauck, and Ferrari. Over and above its physical stores, Babyshop also retails around 20,000 products online through its E-commerce website and Mobile Application on IOS and Android, which was launched on 24 November 2016.

History

In 1973, Babyshop was founded by Mukesh Jagtiani in Bahrain. In 1990, Babyshop expanded to the UAE with its first store in Sharjah. In 2005, the company increased its focus on child safety and began raising awareness. In cooperation with the Roads and Transport Authority, Babyshop began adding child seats to taxis in Dubai for the "Child Safety First" campaign of 2011. The three-month campaign focused on raising awareness of child safety during daily travel. In 2012, Babyshop backed a survey conducted by AC Nielsen regarding parental concerns of child safety, which resulted in roadshows to educate people on child safety.

Babyshop released a book, "Mom's Little Secret," in 2015 to advise expecting mothers and give tips through toddlerhood. The book featured 27 contributors and more than 40 articles.

References

Companies based in Dubai
Retail companies established in 1973
1973 establishments in Bahrain